Wetin Women Want also known as WWW is a 2018 Nigerian movie produced by Seun Oloketuyi and directed by Abiodun Jimoh. The movie that highlights what women want in marriage or relationship, starring Daniel K. Daniel, Mercy Aigbe and Oge Okoye.

Plot 
The movie revolves around the complicated and uncomplicated nature of women. The movie made a make-believe that women are not complicated it only depends on the moods and nature of the issue on ground. In the film, Azu and his  wife, Vero, turn their house upside down which open doors for the question, Wetin Women Want.

Premiere 
The movie was first premiered on February 4, 2018 in Lagos and it hits the cinema on February 9. The producer of the movie led the crew to Kwara State for premiering in honour of the First Lady of Kwara State, Deaconess Omolewa Ahmed.

Cast 

 Daniel K. Daniel,
 Katherine Obiang,
 Oge Okoye,
 Mercy Aigbe,
 Adaora Ukoh,
 Anthony Monjaro,
 Jumoke Odetola

References 

2018 films
Nigerian drama films
English-language Nigerian films